Brandon C. Rodegeb, better known as B-12 (born October 9, 1977) is a music executive, film maker, and rap artist. Brandon was born in San Francisco, CA at San Francisco General Hospital and raised in Benicia, California. Living in an area rich in cultural and hip-hop history gave Brandon access to hip-hop music  at an early age. The youngest son of a single mother with two brothers (one murdered in 1994) and a sister, Brandon was interested in music when very young.

Growing up around such rap legends as Too Short, 11/5, RBL Posse, and others, B-12 was able to get into music early.  Success followed, although not immediately, and his family later moved to the nearby suburb of Vallejo, California in 1991.

He also made an album that featured several west coast artists including: MC Eiht, Celly Cel, Taydatay, 11/5, Young Droop, San Quinn, Luni Coleone, M.O.G., Jay Tee, Boo-Yaa T.R.I.B.E., Skee 64, Young Dru, Da' Unda' Dogg and also Eightball, who is from Memphis, Tennessee.

In 2002 B-12, Jay Tee & Young Dru formed the group Free Agents and released the album Negotiations on 40 Ounce Records. The project is described as "a loosely knit group of 'rap comrades' who came together to make a statement about independence and ownership in a turbulent time in the music industry."

Discography

Collaboration albums

Neva Look Back with Riderlife (2001)
Negotiations with Free Agents (2002)

Compilation albums
Bayriderz, Vol. 3: Kalifornia: State of Emergency with Jay Tee (2003)
The Kollection (2017)

Guest appearances

References
 
Showcase Magazine

External links
http://www.siccness.net
A-Wax

1977 births
Living people
American rappers
People from Benicia, California
Musicians from Vallejo, California
21st-century American rappers